Fluorocarbons are chemical compounds with carbon-fluorine bonds.  Compounds that contain many C-F bonds often has distinctive properties, e.g., enhanced stability, volatility, and hydrophobicity.  Fluorocarbons and their derivatives are commercial polymers, refrigerants, drugs, and anesthetics.

Nomenclature
Perfluorocarbons or PFCs, are organofluorine compounds with the formula CxFy, i.e., they contain only carbon and fluorine. The terminology is not strictly followed and many fluorine-containing organic compounds are called fluorocarbons.
Compounds with the prefix perfluoro- are hydrocarbons, including those with heteroatoms, wherein all C-H bonds have been replaced by C-F bonds. Fluorocarbons includes perfluoroalkanes, fluoroalkenes, fluoroalkynes, and perfluoroaromatic compounds.

Perfluoroalkanes

Chemical properties
Perfluoroalkanes are very stable because of the strength of the carbon–fluorine bond, one of the strongest in organic chemistry.
Its strength is a result of the electronegativity of fluorine imparting partial ionic character through partial charges on the carbon and fluorine atoms, which shorten and strengthen the bond through favorable covalent interactions. Additionally, multiple carbon–fluorine bonds increase the strength and stability of other nearby carbon–fluorine bonds on the same geminal carbon, as the carbon has a higher positive partial charge. Furthermore, multiple carbon–fluorine bonds also strengthen the "skeletal" carbon–carbon bonds from the inductive effect. Therefore, saturated fluorocarbons are more chemically and thermally stable than their corresponding hydrocarbon counterparts, and indeed any other organic compound. They are susceptible to attack by very strong reductants, e.g. Birch reduction and very specialized organometallic complexes.

Fluorocarbons are colorless and have high density, up to over twice that of water. They are not miscible with most organic solvents (e.g., ethanol, acetone, ethyl acetate, and chloroform), but are miscible with some hydrocarbons (e.g., hexane in some cases). They have very low solubility in water, and water has a very low solubility in them (on the order of 10 ppm). They have low refractive indices.

As the high electronegativity of fluorine reduces the polarizability of the atom, fluorocarbons are only weakly susceptible to the fleeting dipoles that form the basis of the London dispersion force. As a result, fluorocarbons have low intermolecular attractive forces and are lipophobic in addition to being hydrophobic and non-polar. Reflecting the weak intermolecular forces these compounds exhibit low viscosities when compared to liquids of similar boiling points, low surface tension and low heats of vaporization. The low attractive forces in fluorocarbon liquids make them compressible (low bulk modulus) and able to dissolve gas relatively well. Smaller fluorocarbons are extremely volatile. There are five perfluoroalkane gases: tetrafluoromethane (bp −128 °C), hexafluoroethane (bp −78.2 °C), octafluoropropane (bp −36.5 °C), perfluoro-n-butane (bp −2.2 °C) and perfluoro-iso-butane (bp −1 °C). Nearly all other fluoroalkanes are liquids; the most notable exception is perfluorocyclohexane, which sublimes at 51 °C. Fluorocarbons also have low surface energies and high dielectric strengths.

Flammability
In the 1960s there was a lot of interest in fluorocarbons as anesthetics. The research did not produce any anesthetics, but the research included tests on the issue of flammability, and showed that the tested fluorocarbons were not flammable in air in any proportion, though most of the tests were in pure oxygen or pure nitrous oxide (gases of importance in anesthesiology).

In 1993, 3M considered fluorocarbons as fire extinguishants to replace CFCs. This extinguishing effect has been attributed to their high heat capacity, which takes heat away from the fire. It has been suggested that an atmosphere containing a significant percentage of perfluorocarbons on a space station or similar would prevent fires altogether.

When combustion does occur, toxic fumes result, including carbonyl fluoride, carbon monoxide, and hydrogen fluoride.

Gas dissolving properties
Perfluorocarbons dissolve relatively high volumes of gases. The high solubility of gases is attributed to the weak intermolecular interactions in these fluorocarbon fluids.

The table shows values for the mole fraction, of nitrogen dissolved, calculated from the Blood–gas partition coefficient, at 298.15 K (25 °C), 0.101325 MPa.

Manufacture
The development of the fluorocarbon industry coincided with World War II. Prior to that, fluorocarbons were prepared by reaction of fluorine with the hydrocarbon, i.e., direct fluorination. Because C-C bonds are readily cleaved by fluorine, direct fluorination mainly affords smaller perfluorocarbons, such as tetrafluoromethane, hexafluoroethane, and octafluoropropane.

Fowler process
A major breakthrough that allowed the large scale manufacture of fluorocarbons was the Fowler process. In this process, cobalt trifluoride is used as the source of fluorine. Illustrative is the synthesis of perfluorohexane:
C6H14 + 28 CoF3 → C6F14 + 14 HF + 28 CoF2

The resulting cobalt difluoride is then regenerated, sometimes in a separate reactor:
2 CoF2 + F2 → 2 CoF3

Industrially, both steps are combined, for example in the manufacture of the Flutec range of fluorocarbons by F2 chemicals Ltd, using a vertical stirred bed reactor, with hydrocarbon introduced at the bottom, and fluorine introduced halfway up the reactor. The fluorocarbon vapor is recovered from the top.

Electrochemical fluorination
Electrochemical fluorination (ECF) (also known as the Simons' process) involves electrolysis of a substrate dissolved in hydrogen fluoride. As fluorine is itself manufactured by the electrolysis of hydrogen fluoride, ECF is a rather more direct route to fluorocarbons. The process proceeds at low voltage (5 – 6 V) so that free fluorine is not liberated. The choice of substrate is restricted as ideally it should be soluble in hydrogen fluoride. Ethers and tertiary amines are typically employed. To make perfluorohexane, trihexylamine is used, for example:

N(C6H13)3 + 45 HF → 3 C6F14 + NF3 + 42 H2

The perfluorinated amine will also be produced:
N(C6H13)3 + 39 HF → N(C6F13)3 + 39H2

Environmental and health concerns
Fluoroalkanes are generally inert and non-toxic.

Fluoroalkanes are not ozone depleting, as they contain no chlorine or bromine atoms, and they are sometimes used as replacements for ozone-depleting chemicals.
The term fluorocarbon is used rather loosely to include any chemical containing fluorine and carbon, including chlorofluorocarbons, which are ozone depleting. Fluoroalkanes are sometimes confused with fluorosurfactants, which significantly bioaccumulate.

Perfluoroalkanes do not bioaccumulate; those used in medical procedures are rapidly excreted from the body, primarily via expiration with the rate of excretion as a function of the vapour pressure; the half-life for octafluoropropane is less than 2 minutes, compared to about a week for perfluorodecalin.

Low-boiling perfluoroalkanes are potent greenhouse gases, in part due to their very long atmospheric lifetime, and their use is covered by the Kyoto Protocol. The global warming potential (compared to that of carbon dioxide) of many gases can be found in the IPCC 5th assessment report, with an extract below for a few perfluoroalkanes.

The aluminium smelting industry has been a major source of atmospheric perfluorocarbons (tetrafluoromethane and hexafluoroethane especially), produced as by-product of the electrolysis process. However, the industry has been actively involved in reducing emissions in recent years.

Applications
As they are inert, perfluoroalkanes have essentially no chemical uses, but their physical properties have led to their use in many diverse applications. These include:
Perfluorocarbon tracer
Liquid dielectric
Chemical vapor deposition
Organic Rankine cycle
Fluorous biphasic catalysis 
Cosmetics
Ski waxes
As well as several medical uses:
Contrast-enhanced ultrasound
Oxygen Therapeutics
Blood substitute
Liquid breathing
Eye surgery 
Tattoo removal

Fluoroalkenes and fluoroalkynes
Unsaturated fluorocarbons are far more reactive than fluoroalkanes. Although difluoroacetylene is unstable (as is typical for related alkynes, see dichloroacetylene), hexafluoro-2-butyne and related fluorinated alkynes are well known.

Polymerization
Fluoroalkenes polymerize more exothermically than normal alkenes. Unsaturated fluorocarbons have a driving force towards sp3 hybridization due to the electronegative fluorine atoms seeking a greater share of bonding electrons with reduced s character in orbitals. The most famous member of this class is tetrafluoroethylene, which is used to manufacture polytetrafluoroethylene (PTFE), better known under the trade name Teflon.

Environmental and health concerns
Fluoroalkenes and fluorinated alkynes are reactive and many are toxic for example perfluoroisobutene. To produce polytetrafluoroethylene various fluorinated surfactants are used, in the process known as Emulsion polymerization, and the surfactant included in the polymer can bioaccumulate.

Perfluoroaromatic compounds
Perfluoroaromatic compounds contain only carbon and fluorine, like other fluorocarbons, but also contain an aromatic ring. The three most important examples are hexafluorobenzene, octafluorotoluene, and octafluoronaphthalene.

Perfluoroaromatic compounds can be manufactured via the Fowler process, like fluoroalkanes, but the conditions must be adjusted to prevent full fluorination. They can also be made by heating the corresponding perchloroaromatic compound with potassium fluoride at high temperature (typically 500 °C), during which the chlorine atoms are replaced by fluorine atoms. A third route is defluorination of the fluoroalkane; for example, octafluorotoluene can be made from perfluoromethylcyclohexane by heating to 500 °C with a nickel or iron catalyst.

Perfluoroaromatic compounds are relatively volatile for their molecular weight, with melting and boiling points similar to the corresponding aromatic compound, as the table below shows. They have high density and are non-flammable. For the most part, they are colorless liquids. Unlike the perfluoralkanes, they tend to be miscible with common solvents.

See also
:Category:Fluorocarbons
Fluorochemical industry
Hydrofluorocarbon
Fluorographene
Perfluorocycloalkene (PFCA)

References

External links

Fluorocarbons and Sulphur Hexafluoride, proposed by the European Fluorocarbons Technical Committee
CFCs and Ozone Depletion Freeview video provided by the Vega Science Trust.
Introduction to fluoropolymers
Organofluorine chemistry by Graham Sandford

Fluorocarbons
Greenhouse gases